The Death Valley Fault Zone (DVFZ) is a right lateral-moving (dextral) geologic fault  in eastern California. It runs from a connection with the Furnace Creek Fault Zone in the Amargosa Valley southward to a junction with the Garlock Fault. It is considered an integral part of the Walker Lane.

External links
USGS Database: Death Valley Fault Zone
Northern Death Valley fault zone, Grapevine Mountains section (Class A) No. 141a
Southern Death Valley fault zone, Nobel Hills section (Class A) No. 143b

Seismic faults of California
Death Valley National Park
Geology of Inyo County, California
Geology of San Bernardino County, California
Natural history of the Mojave Desert
Natural history of Inyo County, California
Natural history of San Bernardino County, California